Minuscule 667 (in the Gregory-Aland numbering), ε 1185 (von Soden), is a Greek minuscule manuscript of the New Testament, on parchment. Palaeographically it has been assigned to the 11th or 12th century. The manuscript has complex contents. Scrivener labelled it by 900e.

Description 

The codex contains the entire of the four Gospels, on 178 parchment leaves (size ). The text is written in one column per page, 25-28 lines per page, in very small letters.

The leaves 163 and 170 were supplemented in the 16th century.

Text 

The Greek text of the codex is a representative of the Byzantine text-type. Kurt Aland did not placed it in any Category.

According to the Wisse's Profile Method it belongs to the textual family Kx in Luke 1; 10; 20. It is close to the Codex Athous Dionysiou.

History 

Gregory dated it to the 11th or 12th century. Currently the manuscript is dated by the INTF to the 11th or 12th century.

The manuscript was bought by Albert L. Long in Constantinople (see Minuscule 668).

Gregory saw the manuscript in 1895.

Currently the manuscript is housed at the Drew University (Ms. 11), in Madison, New Jersey.

See also 

 List of New Testament minuscules
 Biblical manuscript
 Textual criticism

References

Further reading 
 Everett A. Overton, The 'Drew' Gospel Manuscripts, Drew University 1933, 687-700
 

Greek New Testament minuscules
11th-century biblical manuscripts